James Cameron Davidson  (born 13 December 1953) is an English stand-up comedian, actor, singer and TV presenter. He hosted the television shows Big Break and The Generation Game. He also developed two adult pantomime shows, Boobs in the Wood and Sinderella, to critical reception.

Biography 

The son of a Scottish father from Glasgow and Irish mother from Cork, Davidson was born in Kidbrooke, London, and attended Kidbrooke Park Primary School, Blackheath, and St Austin's School in Charlton. Having impressed some acquaintances of his father with impressions of celebrities, he was chosen to appear in Ralph Reader's Gang Show at the Golders Green Hippodrome aged 12 and appeared on television in the Billy Cotton Band Show. He also briefly attended a stage school in Woolwich.

Upon leaving school, Davidson worked as a drummer for pub bands, as well as holding a job as a supermarket shelf stacker, a messenger, air ticket clerk for a travel agency, a cashier for Wall's ice cream and for Rank Xerox (having trained as a reprographics operator) and a window cleaner.

Davidson found his way into show business when, as a regular in a pub in Woolwich, he stepped in after the pub's regular comedian had not turned up. He then became a regular on the London comedy circuit, and first auditioned unsuccessfully for Opportunity Knocks in 1975. His audition for New Faces was more successful, and he proceeded to win the show by one point, coming second in the overall contest.

Television career 

Davidson's success was quickly followed by many more appearances on television, including What's on Next, and several series of his own television show, The Jim Davidson Show (1979—1982), which ran for five complete series and won Davidson the TV Times award as "Funniest Man on Television".

Davidson appeared on an edition of the BBC1 series Seaside Special, shown on 20 August 1977, hosted by Tony Blackburn and David Hamilton. His appearance garnered negative reviews in The Stage, with the show's reviewer, Martyn Wade, commenting that: "...comedian Jim Davidson had already won first prize for lack of taste with crude racist jokes tracing the adventures of a black man whose nickname was Chalky and whose other names included Toilet-Roll. 'Day-light come and I gotta sign on' is a representative line from Mr Davidson's act."

He starred in TV sitcoms Up the Elephant and Round the Castle (1983–1985) and Home James! (1987–1990). His one-man show for Thames Television, Stand Up Jim Davidson (1990), was recorded at London's Royalty Theatre.

Davidson became known for Big Break (1991–2002) and as the third host of The Generation Game (1995–2002), as the successor to Bruce Forsyth and Larry Grayson. In September 2007, Davidson appeared in the third series of Hell's Kitchen (2007) in the UK, and in May 2008 he appeared in the BBC's Comedy Map of Britain.

On 2 January 2013, Davidson was set to become a housemate in the 11th series of Celebrity Big Brother, but was arrested at Heathrow Airport by police officers working on Operation Yewtree. On 3 January 2014, a year after being arrested and without being charged, he became a housemate in the show's 13th series. On 29 January 2014, he left the Big Brother house as the winner.

Touring show 

Davidson's touring material developed from his original London comedy circuit show, aimed for pub and club audiences, a demographic considerably different to that of his television work; his touring material contains much stronger language, which Davidson promotes as 'adult entertainment'.

Davidson later developed his touring material into his adult pantomime work, including productions with titles such as Boobs in the Wood, a spoof of Robin Hood, and SINderella.

In 2006, for the first time in 14 years, he refused to play Great Yarmouth, stating that the resort was "full of overweight people in flip-flops and fat children of all colours and no class". The inhabitants of the town took this as a personal affront, although Davidson later stated that he was referring to tourists.

Recording career 

Davidson has appeared in the UK singles chart under his own name with the double A-sided "White Christmas"/"Too Risky". It peaked at No. 52 in December 1980.

Business 

Davidson has several business interests. He set up a company which bought or leased several seaside theatres or piers, including the Winter Gardens building in Great Yarmouth, which was converted into a nightclub. He lost £700,000 on a pantomime production of Dick Whittington and after a meeting with the Inland Revenue in 2003, he sold the company.

Armed forces and charity 

Davidson has entertained British Armed Forces, and is currently chairman of the British Forces Foundation charity, which aims to promote the wellbeing and esprit de corps of service personnel. Davidson was awarded the OBE in the 2001 New Year Honours List for his services to charity.

Davidson is a Freemason and a long-standing member of the Westminster City Council Lodge No. 2882. He was formerly also a member of the Chelsea Lodge No. 3098 (whose members are all entertainers) but has resigned; he was the founding Worshipful Master of British Forces Foundation Lodge No. 9725 on its formation in 2000.

Taxation and bankruptcy 

On 27 August 2003, after a meeting with the Inland Revenue, Davidson claimed he spent £10,000 a week on back taxes, commission to agents, maintenance and school fees, and a £2.2 million mortgage: "My problem is money – I used to earn five times as much as I do now, but I still pay the same maintenance, school fees and commission to agents," he told Radio Times magazine.

On 6 July 2006, having failed to keep up payments on a £1.4 million back tax bill that he had reduced to £700,000, Davidson was declared bankrupt.

Online career 

In spring 2020, Davidson launched his own YouTube channel, where he presented short videos each week, giving his take on the recent news events, and sharing his opinion on news stories and events of the day. The channel was launched at the start of the COVID-19 pandemic and subsequent lockdown in the United Kingdom.

Davidson continues to upload short videos, usually on a daily basis. Since the current lockdown measures have been put into place in England, he has named his daily uploads as "Lockdown Diary" since December 2020.

By the autumn of 2020, Davidson's online career expanded further when he launched Jim Davidson TV, his own dedicated website and a forerunner to his business venture named "Ustreme", which launched in November 2020 and replaced Jim Davidson TV.

Controversies 

Throughout his career, Davidson has made jokes about women, ethnic minorities, homosexuals and disabled people in his stand-up act, which has made him a subject of frequent criticism.

Alleged bigotry

Laurence Clark, a wheelchair user, performed a show called 'The Jim Davidson Guide to Equality' in response to Davidson's act at the Edinburgh Festival Fringe in 2004. Clark stated that he would refuse to perform the show if Davidson himself was in his audience. The following year, journalist Martin Fletcher described Davidson as "extraordinarily foul-mouthed, racist, and sexist" and a "throwback", whilst quoting television critic Garry Bushell describing Davidson a "family entertainer".

In October 2006, Davidson was accused of making insensitive jokes about cancer sufferers, blind people, a woman in a wheelchair, and the recent trial over the murder of Damilola Taylor, prompting a woman to walk out of the show in disgust. Davidson vehemently denied the charge, claiming that jokes about blind people and cancer sufferers would have merited a "mass walkout". He also said the comments about the Damilola Taylor trial were taken out of context: "My actual remark was that I thought the killers should be locked away forever. And if she objects to that then that is her prerogative." Davidson was also quoted as saying "If what I was saying was true I would have got up and left myself".

In September 2007, Davidson participated in the celebrity reality TV programme Hell's Kitchen and attracted negative media attention over homophobic bullying towards TV presenter and openly gay contestant Brian Dowling. Davidson asked Dowling, "Are you on our side?" when referring to whether or not he would be participating for the boys' or girls' team. Davidson used the word "shirt-lifters" in front of him, and constantly asked if Dowling would like to try on one of "John Virgo's lovely waistcoats", which Davidson owns. Davidson later described himself as a "homophobic arsehole". The programme was broadcast on ITV on 4 September 2007. On 10 September, Davidson was asked to leave Hell's Kitchen, following further confrontations with Dowling. After Davidson's exit from the programme, the BBC reported that the broadcasting watchdog Ofcom had received 46 complaints alleging that Davidson had bullied Dowling. Ofcom concluded that nothing unacceptable had happened, but ITV, the channel which had originally broadcast the programme, issued a statement, regretting Davidson's "unacceptable remarks".

Davidson again faced controversy in December 2007, when he made a joke about rape victims during a show at the Newark Palace Theatre, in Nottinghamshire. A local paper, the Nottingham Evening Post, stated that: "there were moments when he did stray too far over the line (most notably with a routine on rape)."

Davidson has responded to accusations of prejudice by saying: "It is a difficult thing, comedy, and I'm on a loser. If I cured AIDS and fed Africa and ended Ebola and found that missing aeroplane I'd still be that horrible racist, sexist, homophobic comedian. By people, with respect, who haven't seen me. Or are judging me from the past."

Other incidents

In 2002, Davidson was escorted from the grounds of the Marriott Bristol Royal Hotel, after it was alleged that he had become confrontational and abusive to staff.

In October 2003, Davidson refused to go on stage in Plymouth because he objected to wheelchair users in the front row. A spokesman for the Plymouth Pavilions, where he was performing as part of a national tour, said: "Jim Davidson apparently took exception to a number of wheelchair users in the front stalls of the Pavilions Arena. Mr Davidson cited the fact that a proportion of his act was aimed at disabled customers and that he would be unable to perform under these circumstances." In a statement Davidson explained he "took the mick" out of everyone in the front row of his shows. "As all the people in the front row were in wheelchairs I feared it would appear I was specifically targeting disabled people. I asked if just some would mind moving. Much of my act depends upon audience reaction and in fact one part of the show involves getting the audience to gang up against the front row."

In 2004, comedian Jimmy Carr threatened legal action against Davidson, accusing him of having plagiarised some of his comic material. Davidson responded by saying the claims were "ridiculous", and no further action was taken.

Davidson was called on as a character witness to drug trafficker Brian Brendan Wright in 2007. Despite Davidson's testifying to Wright's character, the judge concluded that Wright was "a master criminal, manipulative, influential and powerful", and sentenced him to 30 years in prison.

On 2 January 2013, as Davidson was set to become a housemate in the 11th series of Celebrity Big Brother, he was arrested at Heathrow Airport by police officers working on Operation Yewtree. On 20 March 2013 he was arrested again over new allegations of sexual offences; however, on 21 August 2013, it was announced that no further action would be taken in relation to the allegations of historic sex abuse, due to insufficient evidence.

On 21 November 2018, Davidson was caught up in London traffic resulting from Extinction Rebellion protests which blocked a number of London bridges to raise awareness of a claimed lack of action from governments over climate change. Davidson was photographed by the BBC, allegedly shouted at police and was filmed near the front of a blockade driving a large SUV, where he remarked that Jeremy Corbyn (who was not involved) was an "environmental disaster". Davidson later told Nigel Farage on LBC radio that the reason for his anger had been that the demonstrations had almost prevented him "from getting his pie and mash".

Personal life 

Davidson has written two autobiographies, The Full Monty (1993) and Close to the Edge (2001).

Davidson's numerous marriages prompted the actor John Mills to send a Telemessage on the occasion of his fourth, which read simply: "Will It Last?" The marriage ended ten years later. Davidson subsequently returned the compliment to Mills and his wife on their 60th wedding anniversary, with a Telemessage bearing the same wording.

In March 2004, Davidson, a Conservative Party supporter, publicly left the United Kingdom for the tax haven of Dubai, United Arab Emirates in protest at the then-Labour party government under Tony Blair, although it was also noted by HMRC at the time that his move coincided with an unpaid tax bill of approximately £700,000. At the time, he declared that "I may as well go to Dubai and be an ethnic minority there than wait five years till I become one here." He moved back to the UK after living in Dubai for five years. He has also expressed sympathy for UKIP leader Nigel Farage, describing the party as "the Jim Davidson of the political world".

Davidson is a supporter of Charlton Athletic, the local club in the area where he grew up. In the 1980s, he was a director at AFC Bournemouth.

On 18 June 2014, Davidson attended the assault trial of former N-Dubz rapper Dappy. "Dappy is a good friend of mine. I don't know what's happened in this case but I'm just here to show him my support," Davidson said. Dappy declined Davidson's offer to serve as a character witness.

Family 

Davidson has been married five times. His first four marriages ended in divorce, and he has five children by three wives:

Sue Walpole (married 1971; divorced 1972), 1 child
Julie Gullick (married 1981; divorced 1986), 1 child
Alison Holloway (married 1987; divorced 1988)
Tracy Hilton (married 1990; divorced 2000), 3 children
Michelle Cotton (married 2009)

Credits

Television 

Big Break (222 episodes) 
New Faces
Stand Up Jim Davidson
Pingwings
The Generation Game (143 episodes) 
The Jim Davidson Show
Up the Elephant and Round the Castle (22 episodes) 
Home James! (25 episodes) 
Life's a Pitch
What's on Next?
Tiswas
Who Wants to Be a Millionaire?
Hell's Kitchen
Celebrity Big Brother

Film 

 A Zed & Two Noughts (1985), as Joshua Plate
 Colour Me Kubrick (2006), as Lee Pratt

Music 

"Watching Over You"
"A Time for Remembering"
"Love, Please Stop Leaving Me"

Theatre 

In 2011, Davidson toured with a play, Stand Up...And Be Counted. The play was about the failing career of a washed-up racist comic. Media commentators drew comparisons between the play's main character and Davidson's own career. On 18 March 2011, Davidson announced the show was being cancelled because of poor ticket sales, having visited only four of the 12 planned city destinations. Davidson added that he was still in talks to bring the show to the West End at a later date. Davidson also produced and starred in a number of so-called "adult pantomimes", which were blue-humoured versions of conventional pantomimes. These included Sinderella (1995), Boobs in the Wood (1999), Sinderella Comes Again (2004), and Sinderella 2: Scottish Romp (2015).

References

Bibliography 
 Jim Davidson: Close to the Edge. 2001. Ebury Press.

External links 

 
 

1953 births
Living people
Reality show winners
English male stage actors
English autobiographers
English expatriates in the United Arab Emirates
Freemasons of the United Grand Lodge of England
English game show hosts
English male comedians
English people of Irish descent
English people of Scottish descent
English stand-up comedians
English television presenters
Officers of the Order of the British Empire
People from Greenwich
English male film actors
Conservative Party (UK) people
Operation Yewtree
People from Bulphan
20th-century English comedians
21st-century English comedians